Juliana Martins (born 3 October 1984 in José Bonifácio, São Paulo state) is a Brazilian model. She worked for Sports Illustrated, and contested in the 1997 Elite Model Look. Juliana Martins was labeled the Brazilian Cindy Crawford by John Casablancas when she was thirteen years old .

Print
Marie Claire
Sports Illustrated

External links

Juliana Martins at Askmen

References
 IstoÉ magazine

Living people
1984 births
Brazilian female models
People from São Paulo (state)